The 1979 Arab Athletics Championships was the second edition of the international athletics competition between Arab countries. It took place in Baghdad, Iraq from 23–26 October. As of 2015, it remains the only senior international athletics competition to have been held in the country.

Following the men-only inaugural tournament, the second edition marked the introduction of a women's programme. A total of 32 athletics events were contested, 22 for men and 10 for women. The men's decathlon became the combined track and field event to be contested at the championships, and the men's hammer throw was also added to the schedule. Women athletes, entered by four nations, competed in short track running events, as well as two jumping and three throwing field events. This represented the first major gathering of Arab women at an athletics championships – the Pan Arab Games did not admit women in the sport until six years later.

Medal summary

Men

Women

Medal table

Overall

Men

Women

References

Results
 Al Batal Al Arabi (N°:2). Arab Athletics Union. Retrieved on 2015-02-14.

Arab Athletics Championships
Sport in Baghdad
Arab Athletics Championships
Arab Athletics Championships, 1979
International athletics competitions hosted by Iraq
Arab Athletics Championships
Arab Athletics Championships